Houses of the Horny is a studio album by the Mentors released in 1994, containing demo versions of tracks from what would have been their next album. The album was the last Mentors release in El Duce's lifetime, and was sold at Mentors concerts and via mailorder. It was only available on cassette. The title parodies the Led Zeppelin album Houses of the Holy.

In 1997, when German record label Maximum Metal reissued You Axed for It! and Up the Dose, tracks from this album were added as bonuses. You Axed for It! included "Wine Her, Dine Her and 69 Her", "In and Out of You", "Leave Some for the Vultures" from To the Max and an unreleased track called "Sex Education", which had been recorded in the Houses of the Horny sessions. Up the Dose included "Kings of Sleaze", "Service Me or Be Smacked", "All Women are Insane" from To the Max and "Split the Square", although "Service Me or Be Smacked" is a different version to what appears on the tape.

In 2019, Houses of the Horny was reissued on CD, featuring "Sex Education", an unreleased track called "Slutfucker Paradise" whose title had been listed on the cover of the original 1994 release, the track "Million Dollar High", which had previously been known from a leaked demo recording from 1989, and several alternate mixes of songs, plus "The Roughest and the Toughest", an early version of "Wine Her, Dine Her and 69 Her".

Track listing

References

External links
 Houses of the Horny at Discogs
 Houses of the Horny at Metal Archives

1994 albums
Demo albums